The Oceania Marathon and Half Marathon Championships are an annual Road running competition organized by the Oceania Athletics Association (OAA) for athletes representing the countries of its member associations. They were established in 2008. Races are featured for male and female athletes.  The event is held together with the Gold Coast Marathon.  The first three open men and women Oceania athletes to finish the Marathon and Half Marathon will be presented with the Oceania Championship medals.

Editions

Results 
Complete results (beginning in 2009) can be found on the Gold Coast Marathon website.  The results for 2008 were extracted
from different websites.

Men's Marathon

Men's Half Marathon

Women's Marathon

Women's Half Marathon

References 

Marathons in Australia
Recurring sporting events established in 2008
Sports competitions in Queensland
Marathon